Joseph William Colby (October 31, 1854July 15, 1916) was an American maritime pilot. He guided steamships into the Boston Harbor for 36 years. He was captain of the celebrated pilot boat Sylph for 23 years.

Early life
Captain Joseph W. Colby or "Joe" Colby was born in Newburyport, Massachusetts on October 31, 1854. His father, grandfather and great grandfather were pilots on the Merrimack River. His father was Benjamin Edward Colby and his mother was Eleanor F. Williams. He was married to Mary Laura Colby and had six children.

Career

Colby guided steamships into the Port of Boston for 36 years. In 1867, at age thirteen, Colby went to sea. In 1873, he became chief officer on the ship John N. Cushing. He joined the Boston Pilots' Association in 1876 and received his commission to pilot vessels in Boston Harbor and Massachusetts Bay in 1880. He also had a license to operate steam vessels. 

Colby was captain and principal owner of the 66-ton pilot boat Sylph, No. 8., when she was launched in 1878. He was with her as a boatkeeper or pilot for 23 years. On May 23, 1896, Captain J. W. Colby was on the Sylph, when it towed the fishing sloop Main Girl, into Provincetown Harbor. The sloop was ten miles east of Highland Light, her rigging had fallen to pieces, and she was without a sail. On October 29, 1886, Colby assisted in rescuing the crew that were on the Cunard Line steamship Pavonia when it was wrecked. He received a medal for an act of heroism. 

On May 28, 1897, Colby and Franklin B. Wellock brought in the battleship Massachusetts and cruiser New York. Colby was in charge of bringing up the New York and Wellock was in charge of the Massachusetts.

In November 1899, Colby placed Sylph out of commission and moved her to East Boston. During this time, many transatlantic liners were being used as supply ships during the South African wars.

On August 22, 1901, pilot Colby of the pilot boat America, No. 1, brought into Long Wharf the fruit steamer Admiral Schley through a thick fog 140 miles from the South Shoal lightship. 

Colby was a member of the Boston Pilots' Relief Society and was its treasurer from 1902 to his death. He was also a member of the Boston Pilots' Association, the Volunteer Harbor No. 4; American Association of Master Mates and Pilots; and St. John's Lodge, A.F. & A.M, of Newburyport. He was also a trustee of the M. E. Bethel Church of East Boston.

Death
Colby died in East Boston on July 15, 1916. His funeral was at his family residence. His interment was at the Oak Hill Cemetery in Newburyport, Massachusetts.

See also
 List of Northeastern U. S. Pilot Boats

References

People from Boston
1916 deaths
Maritime pilotage
1854 births
Sea captains